Joseph Donnachie (18 December 1882 – 31 December 1966) was a Scottish professional footballer. An outside left or outside right, he played in the Football League for Newcastle United, Everton, Oldham Athletic and Blackpool.

Club career
He began his career in his native Scotland with newly formed Rutherglen Glencairn in the late 19th century. He signed for Morton, and had a loan stint with Albion Rovers. In 1905, aged 20, he moved south to join Newcastle United. He made just two League appearances for the Magpies before joining Everton the following February. In three years at Goodison Park he made forty League appearances.

In 1908 he joined Oldham Athletic, with whom he spent the bulk of his career. In six years he made 216 League appearances. He also scored his first League goal for the Latics, and went on to score nineteen in total.

He had a short spell back in Scotland with Rangers, making five Scottish Football League appearances (he was one of several players of the Catholic faith to feature for the club up to that time, after which an unwritten rule was introduced at the club which persisted for several decades) then returned to Everton in 1919, for whom he made a further sixteen League appearances. The following year he moved a short distance up the west coast to sign with Blackpool. In nineteen League appearances with the Seasiders he scored one goal.

Donnachie finished his career with Chester City as player-manager.

International career
Donnachie made three appearances for the Scottish national team, all during his spell with Oldham Athletic. He scored one goal, in a 1–1 draw with Ireland on 14 March 1914.

Personal life
Donnachie's son, also called Joe, was also a footballer, playing for Everton, Bolton Wanderers and Chester City. He was killed in an aircraft accident in 1944.

References

1882 births
1966 deaths
People from Kilwinning
Scottish footballers
Scotland international footballers
Rutherglen Glencairn F.C. players
Greenock Morton F.C. players
Albion Rovers F.C. players
Newcastle United F.C. players
Everton F.C. players
Oldham Athletic A.F.C. players
Rangers F.C. players
Blackpool F.C. players
Chester City F.C. players
Scottish football managers
Association football outside forwards
Footballers from North Ayrshire
Scottish Football League players
Scottish Junior Football Association players
English Football League players